Sandro Mike Lauper (born 25 October 1996) is a Swiss professional footballer who plays as a midfielder for Swiss Super League club Young Boys.

Career
On 1 July 2018, Lauper joined Young Boys on a four-year contract.

Career statistics

Club

References

External links
 

Living people
1996 births
Swiss men's footballers
Association football midfielders
Swiss Super League players
FC Thun players
BSC Young Boys players